Philip Bester and Peter Polansky were the defending champions but chose not to defend their title.

Marcelo Arévalo and Miguel Ángel Reyes-Varela won the title after defeating Miķelis Lībietis and Dennis Novikov 6–7(6–8), 7–6(7–1), [10–6] in the final.

Seeds

Draw

References
 Main Draw

Cary Challenger - Doubles
2017 Doubles